Elliott Anthony (1827 — 1898) was a prominent Illinois lawyer and judge who was active in the founding of the Republican Party.

Biography

Elliott Anthony was born in Onondaga County, New York on June 10, 1827. He was raised as a Quaker, being born into a family that had been Quaker for generations.  In 1845, he enrolled in Courtland Academy and in the fall of 1847, entered Hamilton College, graduating in 1850 with high honors.

After college, Anthony read law with Timothy Dwight V.  In May 1851, he was admitted to the bar of New York. In June 1851, he spent one year at Sterling, Illinois.  He returned East in July 1852 and on July 14, 1852 married Mary Dwight, a granddaughter of Timothy Dwight IV and sister of Timothy Dwight V.  In November 1852, the couple returned to Illinois, settling in Chicago.  With the aid of his wife, in two years Anthony prepared and published a digest of the Illinois Reports.  Four years later, he was elected City Attorney and then Corporation Counsel.

In 1858 or 1859, Anthony was appointed General Solicitor of the Galena and Chicago Union Railroad, which position he held until 1864, when that corporation became consolidated with the Chicago and North Western Railway Company.  When that took place, Anthony was employed by the non-consenting stockholders and bondholders, and engaged in a litigation to break up the consolidation.  He published a book on railway consolidation in 1865.  The case was ultimately argued before David Davis of the United States Supreme Court and Samuel Hubbel Treat, Jr. of Springfield, and resulted in favor of Anthony's clients.

In 1876, he was called again to the position of corporation counsel under Mayor of Chicago Monroe Heath, and took a conspicuous part at that time in the great reform movement in connection with Thomas Hoyne.

Anthony early took part in the formation of the Republican Party and for more than a quarter of a century was  a leader of that organization. He was twice elected to constitutional conventions, called by the people to revise the Illinois Constitution — the first time in 1862 and the last in 1869-70.  In the last he  was chairman of the executive committee that framed the article in the 1870 constitution, relating to the executive department.  He was a delegate to the 1880 Republican National Convention and aided in the nomination of James A. Garfield for President of the United States.

In November 1880, Anthony was elected Judge of the Superior Court of Chicago by a large majority. He was identified with many of the public improvements of Chicago, such as the establishment of graded streets, water works, public parks, public library and cemeteries.

In 1894, Anthony served as president of the Illinois State Bar Association.

Works by Elliott Anthony
A Treatise on the Law of Consolidation of Railroad Companies (1865)
The Law of Taxation (1877)

References
Charles L. Anthony, Genealogy of the Anthony Family from 1454 to 1904 (1904), pp. 80-81

1827 births
1898 deaths
Illinois state court judges
Illinois Republicans
People from Onondaga County, New York
Hamilton College (New York) alumni
Illinois lawyers
American lawyers admitted to the practice of law by reading law
19th-century American judges
19th-century American lawyers